Harvard University adopted an official seal soon after it was founded in 1636 and named "Harvard College" in 1638; a variant is still used.

Each school within the university (Harvard College, Harvard Medical School, Harvard Law School, Harvard Extension School, Harvard Graduate School of Arts and Sciences, etc.) has its own distinctive shield as well, as do many other internal administrative units such as the Harvard College residential "Houses" and the Harvard Library. Many extracurricular organizationssuch as clubs, societies, and athletic teamsalso have their own shield, often based on the coat of arms of Harvard itself.

Harvard University coat of arms

Description 
The Harvard University coat of arms, or shield, has a field of the color 'Harvard Crimson'. In the foreground are three open books with the word  (Latin for 'truth') inscribed across them. This shield provides the basis for the shields of Harvard University's various schools.

Blazon 
Gules, three open books Argent with edges of leaves and covers on the two sides and bottom and clasps Or, on the books VE - RI - TAS Sable.

History 
The Harvard Board of Overseers originally designed the shield during meetings in December 1643 and January 1644. However, the design was forgotten until rediscovered by University President Josiah Quincy and revealed in the bicentennial celebrations of 1836. In 1843, the Harvard Corporation officially adopted it as a seal, and the seal in use today is very similar.

Faculty of Arts and Sciences (FAS)

Harvard College 
Blazon: Arms of Harvard, differenced by a chevron argent between the books.

Each of the residential houses of Harvard College has its own arms, which are used commonly on merchandise, in architectural ornaments, on dining hall china, etc.

Graduate School of Arts and Science (GSAS)

John A. Paulson School of Engineering and Applied Sciences (SEAS) 
The School of Engineering and Applied Science has its roots in the Lawrence Scientific School, which was endowed by Abbott Lawrence. Since its incorporation as a division of the Faculty of Arts and Sciences in 1977, according to Mason Hammond, "it is properly no longer entitled to the use of separate arms." Nevertheless, SEAS continues to use its arms informally.

Blazon: Argent, a cross raguly (or ragged) gules, and a chief of Harvard (see below).

Extension School
The coat of arms for the Harvard Extension School was approved in 1983. At the top of the shield the three books spelling out Veritas (Latin, "truth") represent graduate education; a similar arrangement is seen on the arms of Harvard's law school, medical school, and other graduate schools.  Instead of a straight line separating it from the rest of the shield, as is found in the other schools, a line with six arcs pointing up was used instead.  A silver chevron was used to represent undergraduate education, a device used in the shield of Harvard College in the 17th to 19th centuries.  Two bushels of wheat are included to represent John Lowell's stipulation that courses should not cost more than two bushels of wheat.  A golden lamp symbolizes both learning and the fact that some classes are taught at night.

Graduate and Professional Schools 
The shields of each of the graduate and professional schools have a standard chief (or top bar) of Harvard, taken from the University shield, formally blazoned "on a chief gules three open books argent with edges of leaves and covers on the two sides and bottom and clasps or, on the books VE - RI - TAS sable," abbreviated "a chief of Harvard." Most of the arms were designed by Pierre de Chaignon la Rose, an alumnus of Harvard College and expert on heraldry, on commission from the University as part of the preparations for the Tercentenary celebrations in 1936. According to  Hammond, "La Rose used as the bases for arms of eight of the remaining ten Graduate Schools arms of  families of the founders or benefactors. Only for the Dental School and the then School of Public Administration, later the Kennedy School of Government, did he invent the arms described below. He felt, however, that since the Graduate Schools had long used the ordinary Harvard Arms, he should incorporate in the arms which he designed an upper compartment in red (a chief gules) on which are displayed in a row the three white books bearing the VE - RI - TAS, i.e., a chief of Harvard...according to his practice."

Radcliffe Arms

Other arms

See also 

 Heraldry of Columbia University
 Coat of arms of Yale University

References

Sources

 
Harvard University. Corporation. Seals, 1650-[1926]. UAI 15.1310, Harvard University Archives.

External links
Seal of approval, May 14, 2015, Harvard Gazette

Harvard
Harvard University